Jonathan Stephen Firth (born 6 April 1967) is an English actor. He is best known for his roles in such noted British television productions as Middlemarch, Far from the Madding Crowd, and Victoria & Albert. He lives in Islington, North London.

Early life
Jonathan Firth was born in Brentwood, Essex, England, to David Norman Lewis and Shirley Jean (née Rolles) Firth. His parents were both children of Methodist missionaries in India, who worked as teachers in Nigeria after their marriage. He is the younger brother of actor Colin Firth and voice coach Kate Firth. The family moved many times, from Billericay to Brentwood, Essex, and then to St. Louis, Missouri (USA) for a year when Jonathan was five.

Upon returning to England the family settled in Winchester, Hampshire, where his father became a history lecturer at King Alfred's College and his mother was a comparative religion lecturer at King Alfred's College, Winchester (now the University of Winchester).

Firth studied at Central School of Speech and Drama and Peter Symonds College in Winchester. His flatmate at one time was actor Rufus Sewell.

After graduation, he toured with the Royal Shakespeare Company, where he made his debut at the age of twenty-seven as Henry VI (1994).

Acting career
In addition to his roles in the theatre, Firth has acted in cinematic films and radio dramas, narrated audiobooks, and has also made notable television appearances, such as Linton Heathcliff in Emily Brontë's Wuthering Heights (1992); Fred Vincy in Middlemarch (1994); Lord Byron in Highlander: The Series (1997); Sergeant Troy in Far from the Madding Crowd, for which he received a nomination for best actor; Lord Arthur Goring in An Ideal Husband (2000); and Prince Albert in Victoria & Albert (2001). He portrayed Joshua in the 2000 biblical film, In the Beginning.

In 2003, he acted in the BBC's dramatised documentary Pompeii: The Last Day. That same year, Firth appeared in the film Luther, portraying Cardinal Aleander, the papal adviser who sought Luther's excommunication. For his performance, he received the CFT Excellence Award for Best Actor in a Motion Picture.

He has also guest-starred in Van der Valk (1991), Inspector Morse (1992); Covington Cross (1992); Cadfael (1994); Agatha Christie's Poirot: Hickory Dickory Dock (1995); Tales from the Crypt (1996); Midsomer Murders The Killings at Badger's Drift (1997); Kangaroo Palace (1998), an Australian drama set in the 1960s; The Magical Legend of the Leprechauns (1999); The Inspector Lynley Mysteries (2002); Sparkling Cyanide (2003); and Jericho (2005). He appeared in The Prince and Me 2: The Royal Wedding (2006), The Prince and Me 3: A Royal Honeymoon (2008) and The Prince and Me 4: The Elephant Adventure (2010).

In 2008, Firth starred as the chef in a short film, The Chef's Letter, played Evan in the radio production of Dame Daphne du Maurier's September Tide, and was also featured in an episode of the American television series Ghost Whisperer. In 2009, he portrayed Dr. David Fuller in the German film .

In 2016, he appeared as Rex Bishop in the BBC series Father Brown episode 4.1 "The Mask of the Demon".

Theatre
 Eden End (Farrant), Royal Theatre, June 2011 
 Henry VI, Part III (Henry), Royal Shakespeare Company 
 The Lulu Plays (Schwartz), Almeida Theatre, London
 Bad Company (Ian), National Theatre Studio

Audio books
 War and Peace by Leo Tolstoy. Narrator, BBC Audiobooks, 1997
 Julius Caesar by William Shakespeare. Narrator, BBC Radio Collection, 1999
 Shadows of Glory by William Woodruff. Narrator, 2003
 Twelfth Night by William Shakespeare. Narrator, BBC Audiobooks, 2005
 The Two Noble Kinsmen: Arkangel Complete Shakespeare. Narrator, BBC Audiobooks, 2003
 Measure for Measure by William Shakespeare. Narrator, 2006
 Nobody True by James Herbert. Narrator, 2007
 Sepulchre by James Herbert. Narrator, 2008
 I'll Never Be Young Again by Daphne Du Maurier. Narrator
 In Search for Lost Time by Marcel Proust. Narrator, BBC Audiobooks, 2009
 Short Stories: The Thinking Man's Collection. Narrator, 2010
 Heathrow Nights by Jan Mark. Narrator, 2011

References

External links

 YouTube clip of Kangaroo Palace Downloaded 7/29/11

1967 births
20th-century English male actors
21st-century English male actors
Alumni of the Royal Central School of Speech and Drama
English male film actors
English male television actors
People from Brentwood, Essex
Living people
British expatriates in Nigeria
British expatriates in the United States